Hope is an acoustic instrumental from Rush's 2007 album Snakes & Arrows. It was performed on a twelve-string guitar in D Modal (D-A-D-A-A-D) tuning.

Background 

"Hope" is one of the three instrumentals on the Rush album Snakes & Arrows. According to Neil Peart, the title of the instrumental was inspired by the chorus of the ninth Snakes & Arrows track "Faithless", which contains the word "Hope". It is the band's second shortest studio-album-song, clocking in at 2 minutes 2 seconds. Unusual for Rush's compositions, the song was written by Alex Lifeson alone. It is played on a twelve-string guitar and was recorded in two takes. The second take was "just for the heck of it".

A live version of "Hope" was nominated for a Grammy Award, which appeared on the compilation disc Songs for Tibet. The song was recorded on May 25, 2008, in Regina, Saskatchewan, Canada.

See also
List of Rush songs
List of Rush instrumentals

References
Legends of Classic Rock - Rush, the Snakes & Arrows World Album Premiere

2007 songs
Rock instrumentals
Rush (band) songs
Songs written by Alex Lifeson
Song recordings produced by Nick Raskulinecz